Lake Freeman is a reservoir outside of Monticello, Indiana formed in 1925 by the completion of the Oakdale Dam.  Lake Freeman, together with its sister lake, Lake Shafer is part of the Twin Lakes region, a popular summer recreational area centered on the town of Monticello, Indiana.

Construction of the Oakdale Dam began in 1923 and was completed in 1925, damming the waters of the Tippecanoe River.  The earthen dam is 58 feet high, has a maximum capacity of 40,540 acre-feet, normal capacity of 26,140 acre feet, and is owned by the Northern Indiana Public Service Company.

Compared to the more commercial lake, Lake Shafer, Lake Freeman remains more privatized and residential.  Lake Freeman, is however, home of the Madam Carroll, a pleasure excursion vessel, 36 feet (5.5 m) in width and 135 feet (41/5) in length.

Lake Freeman is roughly 1,500 acres (6 km²) in area and has a shoreline of 50 miles (80 km). According to his widow,  it was named for Rhode Island civil engineer Roger Morse Freeman who was involved in many well known projects; his father John R. Freeman, who he started his career with, was an internationally known engineer.

Freeman Lacus on Titan is named after Lake Freeman.

References 

Freeman
Protected areas of White County, Indiana
Dams in Indiana
United States local public utility dams
Dams completed in 1925
Bodies of water of White County, Indiana